Julie and the Phantoms is an American musical comedy-drama streaming television series created by Dan Cross and David Hoge that was released via streaming on Netflix on September 10, 2020. The series is based on the Brazilian television series Julie e os Fantasmas. In December 2021, the series was cancelled after one season.

Cast and characters

Main

 Madison Reyes as Julie Molina, a high school musician who is struggling to make music after the death of her mother but accidentally summons the spirits of a deceased band from the year 1995, whom she becomes the lead singer of. Earlier in the show, she has a crush on Nick, but later Luke becomes her love interest.
 Charlie Gillespie as Luke, a singer and the lead guitarist of the Phantoms, who soon becomes Julie's love interest
 Owen Patrick Joyner as Alex, the Phantoms' drummer, who falls in love with another ghost named Willie
 Jeremy Shada as Reggie, the bass player of the Phantoms
 Jadah Marie as Flynn, Julie's best friend, who eventually finds out about the ghost band who died in 1995
 Sacha Carlson as Nick, Carrie's boyfriend, and Julie's lifelong love interest
 Savannah May as Carrie, Julie's nemesis, and a former friend; the lead singer of Dirty Candy and the daughter of Trevor Wilson

Recurring

 Cheyenne Jackson as Caleb Covington, a famous ghost who owns the Hollywood Ghost Club
 Carlos Ponce as Ray Molina, Julie and Carlos's father
 Sonny Bustamante as Carlos Molina, Julie's younger brother, who becomes suspicious of the ghost band and becomes a junior ghost hunter
 Alison Araya as Aunt Victoria, Julie's aunt, and Ray's sister-in-law
 Marci T. House as Mrs. Harrison, Julie's music program teacher
 Booboo Stewart as Willie, a fellow ghost who loves to skateboard, and who also becomes Alex's love interest

Production

Development
On April 9, 2019, Kenny Ortega signed a multi-year overall deal with Netflix, including production of Julie and the Phantoms. Ortega executive produced the series alongside Dan Cross, David Hoge, George Salinas, and Jaime Aymerich. Cross and Hoge also serve as showrunners. Production companies involved with the series were slated to consist of Crossover Entertainment and Mixer Entertainment. On August 26, 2020, an official trailer was released and the series was released on September 10, 2020. On December 18, 2021, Netflix cancelled the series after one season. On March 4, 2022, Ortega confirmed that there are no plans for the series to return to Netflix or anywhere else for the time being.

Casting
On July 21, 2020, upon series premiere date announcement, Madison Reyes, Charlie Gillespie, Jeremy Shada, Owen Patrick Joyner, Jadah Marie, Sacha Carlson, and Savannah May were cast in the starring roles while Booboo Stewart, Cheyenne Jackson, Carlos Ponce, and Sonny Bustamante were cast in recurring roles.

Filming
Principal photography for the series began on September 17, 2019 and ended on December 14, 2019 in Burnaby, British Columbia.

Music

A soundtrack was released on September 10, 2020, alongside its series debut on the streaming service.

Episodes

Reception

Critical response
Caroline Framke of Variety wrote, "Sure, their ghost adventures become very silly, very quickly. But who cares! Julie and the Phantoms is just fun and adorable enough for none of that to really matter."

For the series, review aggregator Rotten Tomatoes reported an approval rating of 93% based on 27 reviews, with an average rating of 7.9/10. The website's critics consensus reads, "With catchy tunes and just the right amount of ghost jokes, Julie and the Phantoms is a fun, feel-good show that proves a perfect showcase for newcomer Madison Reyes." Metacritic gave the series a weighted average score of 77 out of 100 based on 7 reviews, indicating "generally favorable reviews".

Accolades

References

External links

2020 American television series debuts
2020 American television series endings
2020s American comedy-drama television series
2020s American high school television series
2020s American musical comedy television series
2020s American LGBT-related comedy television series
2020s American LGBT-related drama television series
American television series based on Brazilian television series
English-language Netflix original programming
Gay-related television shows
Hispanic and Latino American television
Television series about teenagers
Television shows filmed in Burnaby
Television series set in 2020
Television shows set in Los Angeles
Netflix children's programming
Television series about ghosts